De profundis refers to Psalm 130 (129 in the Vulgate), traditionally known as the De profundis ("Out of the depths") from its opening words in Latin.

It may refer to:

Films
 , an animated film by Miguelanxo Prado
 De Profundis, a 1990 Italian film directed by Luigi Cozzi, whose title was later changed to The Black Cat
 the German title of the 1919 film Out of the Depths

Music
 De Profundis, a grand-motet by J.-B. Lully, 1683
De Profundis, 7 settings by Marc-Antoine Charpentier, H 156 (1670), H 189 (1683), H 212 (1690), H 213 - H 213 a (1690), H 232 ( ?), H 211 (1690), H 222 ( 1690).
De Profundis by Michel-Richard Delalande
De Profundis C.117, a grand-motet by Louis-Nicolas Clérambault
 De Profundis (Pärt), a composition by Arvo Pärt for men's voices, percussion (ad lib.) and organ, 1980
 De Profundis (ballet), a ballet by J. Lang (2007) to Arvo Pärt's composition; see Colorado Ballet
 De Profundis (Vader album), 1995
 De Profundis (After Crying album), 1996
 De Profundis (PMM album), 2005
 De Profundis (Pizzetti), a musical work by Ildebrando Pizzetti
 De Profundis, a composition for male voice choir by Leevi Madetoja, 1925
 De Profundis, a piano composition with orchestra by Franz Liszt
 De Profundis, a piano sonata by Boris Arapov
 De Profundis, a composition by Frederic Rzewski for solo piano
 "De Profundis", a song by Dead Can Dance
 "De Profundis", a song from The Wild Hunt (Watain album) (2013)
 De Profundis, a British death metal band
 De Profundis, an album by The Cracow Klezmer Band
 De Profundis, a symphony by Heinz Winbeck
 De Profundis, the 2nd symphony composed by Gustavo Becerra-Schmidt

Literature
 De Profundis (letter), an 1897 work written by Oscar Wilde during his imprisonment, in the form of a letter to Lord Alfred Douglas
 "De Profundis", a poem by Federico García Lorca, set to music in the first movement of Shostakovich's Symphony No. 14
 "De Profundis", a 1998 poem by Regina Derieva
 "De Profundis", a poem by J. Slauerhoff in the 1928 collection Eldorado
 "De Profundis", a short story by Arthur Conan Doyle written in 1892
 "AMERICA '62: De Profundis", a 2007 prose piece by Panos Ioannides
 Suspiria de Profundis, a collection of essays by Thomas De Quincey

Other uses
 De Profundis (role-playing game), a tabletop role-playing game
 De Profundis Stone, a recumbent stone in County Westmeath, Ireland at which funeral processions halted to recite the psalm

See also